Table Rock is an unincorporated community in Jackson County, Oregon, United States. It lies near the Rogue River along Table Rock Road between White City and Sams Valley. The topographic features known as Upper and Lower Table Rock are slightly west of the community. Between 1853 and 1856, the Table Rock Indian Reservation lay between Upper Table Rock and Evans Creek, a Rogue River tributary to the west.

A Table Rock post office operated in the vicinity of the two topographic landmarks from 1872 to 1895, until postal authorities changed the office name to Tablerock. Thomas Gianini was the first postmaster. Until the office permanently closed, it continued under the Tablerock name from 1895 through 1906 at varied locations in the valley near the two  mesas.

In 1949, the Southern Pacific opened a Table Rock station on its Siskiyou Line between Eugene and Black Butte, California. The Pacific and Eastern Railway also had a Table Rock station near White City.

References

Unincorporated communities in Jackson County, Oregon
Unincorporated communities in Oregon